Yuliani Santosa (born 29 October 1971) is an Indonesian retired badminton player. She won the 1991 Asian Championships in Kuala Lumpur, Malaysia.

Achievements

Asian Championships 
Women's singles

Asian Cup 
Women's singles

Southeast Asian Games 
Women's singles

IBF World Grand Prix 
The World Badminton Grand Prix was sanctioned by the International Badminton Federation from 1983 to 2006.

Women's singles

 IBF Grand Prix tournament
 IBF Grand Prix Finals tournament

IBF International 
Women's singles

References

External links 
 

1971 births
Living people
People from Semarang
Sportspeople from Central Java
Indonesian people of Chinese descent
Indonesian female badminton players
Badminton players at the 1996 Summer Olympics
Olympic badminton players of Indonesia
Badminton players at the 1994 Asian Games
Asian Games silver medalists for Indonesia
Asian Games medalists in badminton
Medalists at the 1994 Asian Games
Competitors at the 1991 Southeast Asian Games
Competitors at the 1993 Southeast Asian Games
Southeast Asian Games gold medalists for Indonesia
Southeast Asian Games silver medalists for Indonesia
Southeast Asian Games medalists in badminton
20th-century Indonesian women